"Ringa Linga" (Korean: 링가 링가) is a song recorded by South Korean singer Taeyang. It was released as a digital single on November 8, 2013, through YG Entertainment. Later, it became the first single to be released from his second studio album Rise (2014). It was written and composed by Big Bang bandmate G-Dragon and Shockbit.

Commercially, "Ringa Linga" peaked at number six on the Gaon Digital Chart and sold more than 700,000 digital units in South Korea. The song also peaked within the top ten on the US World Digital Songs chart and the K-pop Hot 100.

Composition
The song was written by G-Dragon and produced by G-Dragon and Ricky "Shockbit" Luna. "Ringa Linga" is a mix of trap base, dubstep, electronic music and hip hop. The single's refrain is inspired by a Korean children's nursery song called "Round and Round," a song sung while going round and around with hands held, which was previously used in The Grasshopper Song by Sunny Hill a year prior.

Reception
"Ringa Linga" was chosen by Dazed as the fifth best K-pop song of 2013, with Taylor Glasby commenting that this single shed "the sweet, somewhat hapless guise of his previous singles", writing that Taeyang's "blindingly" confidence made "this unapologetic dancefloor monster" "meth-level addictive." Billboard also ranked at the single number five in their list of best K-Pop songs of the year, describing "Ringa Linga" as a "hard-hitting, club banger" and adding that his "smoky vocals poured over an elaborate production of pumping synths and chest-beating thumps" made the release one of the "most addicting" songs of the year.

Released with only one day left in the tracking week, "Ringa Linga" debuted at number 16 in the Gaon Digital Chart, with 129,876 downloads sold. The following week, the single rose to a peak position of number six, selling additional 151,463 downloads. In the streaming chart, "Ringa Linga" peaked at number eight. During Rises release week in 2014, "Ringa Linga" re-entered the chart at number 55. By mid-2014, "Ringa Linga" sold over 704,000 digital downloads. On the World Digital Song Sales year-end issue for 2014, "Ringa Linga" was ranked as the 22nd best-selling international/foreign language song in the United States.

Promotion
A dance music video was released on November 7, showing the song choreography and Taeyang's dance that emphasized rhythm. Directed by Jerry Evans, the video featured Taeyang and male dancers dancing through a practice room to a garage and to a hallway continuously. The dance performance video captured in one take.

Two days later the music video was also released, the sets included a warehouse, a place in front of a dilapidated building, a barebones elevator, a pickup truck, supported by a dance crew and bandmate G-Dragon. New Zealand choreographer Parris Goebel choreographed the dance. The music video for the song was directed by Seo Hyun-seung.

The first performance of "Ringa Linga" was held on the music show Inkigayo. Taeyang continued promoting the song on M! Countdown and other Inkigayo stages. He also performed at the 2013 Mnet Asian Music Awards. 

In December 2013, a collaboration between YG Entertainment and Samsung Music Project released a remix of the song named "Ringa Linga (Shockbit Remix)".

Charts

Weekly charts

Year-end charts

Music program awards

References

2013 singles
Taeyang songs
Korean-language songs
Songs written by G-Dragon
2013 songs
YG Entertainment singles